The genus Hylobates  is one of the four genera of gibbons.

It was once considered the only genus, but recently its subgenera (Hoolock [formerly Bunopithecus], Nomascus, and Symphalangus) have been elevated to the genus level. Hylobates remains the most species-rich and widespread of gibbon genera, ranging from southern China (Yunnan) to western and central Java.

Individuals within this genus are characterized by 44 chromosomes and often have a ring of white fur around their faces.

Classification
 Family Hylobatidae: gibbons
 Genus Hylobates 
 Lar gibbon or white-handed gibbon, Hylobates lar
 Malaysian lar gibbon, Hylobates lar lar
 Carpenter's lar gibbon, Hylobates lar carpenteri
 Central lar gibbon, Hylobates lar entelloides
 Sumatran lar gibbon, Hylobates lar vestitus
 Yunnan lar gibbon, Hylobates lar yunnanensis
 Bornean white-bearded gibbon, Hylobates albibarbis
 Agile gibbon or black-handed gibbon, Hylobates agilis
 Western grey gibbon or Abbott's grey gibbon, Hylobates abbotti
Eastern grey gibbon or northern grey gibbon, Hylobates funereus
Müller's gibbon or southern grey gibbon, Hylobates muelleri
 Silvery gibbon, Hylobates moloch
 Western silvery gibbon or western Javan gibbon, Hylobates moloch moloch
 Eastern silvery gibbon or central Javan gibbon, Hylobates moloch pongoalsoni
 Pileated gibbon or capped gibbon, Hylobates pileatus
 Kloss's gibbon or Mentawai gibbon, bilou or dwarf siamang, Hylobates klossii
 Genus Hoolock
 Genus Symphalangus
 Genus Nomascus

Hybrids
Hybrids between Müller's gibbon (H. muelleri) and the Bornean white-bearded gibbon, (H. albibarbis) have been reported in areas of Borneo. A gibbon born at the Kujukushima Zoo in Japan to a female lar or white-handed gibbon (H. lar) was determined to have been fathered by a male agile gibbon (H. agilis).

References

External links

 Primate Info Net Hylobates Factsheets

 
Gibbons
Mammals of Southeast Asia
Primate genera
Taxa named by Johann Karl Wilhelm Illiger
Taxa described in 1811

cs:Gibon